Baba Ousmaïla (born September 26, 1986 in Garoua) is a professional Cameroonian  footballer currently playing for Cotonsport Garoua.

Career
Ousmaïla played previously for ESG Gafsa on loan from Club Sportif Sfaxien.

External links
Profile and Pictures - www.cotonsport.com

1986 births
Living people
Cameroonian footballers
Cameroonian Muslims
Expatriate footballers in Tunisia
Coton Sport FC de Garoua players
CS Sfaxien players
EGS Gafsa players
Cameroonian expatriate sportspeople in Tunisia
2011 African Nations Championship players
Association football midfielders
Cameroon A' international footballers